Madurai Metrolite is the proposed metrolite system for the city of Madurai, Tamil Nadu, part of a major expansion of public transport in the city. It is one of the projects devised by the former Chief Minister of Tamil Nadu J.Jayalalithaa.

As of March 2021, the proposal is still only on paper.

Overview 
As the monorail market is estimated to be ₹72,000 crore (US$10 billion) in India, the then Governor of Tamil Nadu, Banwarilal Purohit announced in Legislative assembly that the Government of Tamil Nadu had decided to do a feasibility study for introducing monorail system in Madurai along with Salem, Thiruchirappalli, and Tirunelveli.

Costs 
The government has earmarked a sum of about ₹60,000 crore (US$8.4 billion) for metro and monorail projects in Tamil Nadu.

Proposed routes  
A faculty member from SASTRA, using Geographical Information System (GIS) tools, had worked out a proposal for a suburban railway route for Madurai City.

Madurai proposed routes for monorail are:
 Tirumangalam – Mattuthavani - via. Kappalur, Thirunagar, Thiruparankundram, Palanganatham, TN polytechnic, Madurai Railway station, Simmakkal, Goripalayam, Tallakulam, Madurai Dist court.
 Thiruparankundrum – Park Town - via. Thiruparankundrum Temple, Airport, SN College, Avaniapuram, Villapuram, South Gate, Keelavasal, Nelpettai, Goripalayam, Narimedu, Incometax office, Krishnapuram colony, Viswanathapuram, P & T Nagar.
 Kochadai – Viraganur - via. Kalavasal, Arappalayam, Ellis Nagar, Madurai Railway station, Vilakuthoon, Keelavasal, Munichalai, Teppakulam.
 Vandiyur – Iyer Bungalow - via. Anna Nagar, Suguna stores, Aravind Eye Hospital, K. K. Nagar, Anna Bus stand, GH, Goripalayam, Reserve Line, K. Pudur
 Anuppanadi - Koodal Nagar - Via Teppakulam, Anna nagar, Apollo Hospitals, Mattuthavani, Surveyor Colony, Mahatma Gandhi Nagar, Anaiyur
 Tirumangalam to Melur - Tirumangalam, Kappalur, Thoppur, Tirunagar, Vadapalanji, Madurai Kamaraj University, Nagamalai, Nagari, Samayanallur, Vilangudi, Koodal nagar, Arappalayam Bus Terminus, Simmakal, Madurai railway Jn, Periyar Bus Terminus, Jaihindpuram, Villapuram, Mahal, Teppakulam, Anna nagar, Vandiyur, Pondy koil, Mattuthavani, High Court, TVS Srichakra, Melur.
 Azhagar-koil to Avaniapuram - Azhagarkoil, Moondru Mavadi, K.Pudur, KK Nagar, G.H., Goripalayam, Sellur, Koodal nagar, Arapalayam BS, P.P. chavadi (in Theni main rd), Bye pass rd (Ponmeni), Vasantha Nagar roundana, T V S Nagar, Pykara, Thirupprankundram, Nilaiyur, Airport, Mandela nagar, Transport Nagar (along ring road), Avaniapuram.

Transfer Points are: Avaniyapuram, Goripalayam, Madurai Railway station, Periyar Bus stand, Keelavasal, Anna Nagar, Teppakulam, Mattuthavani, Tiruparankundrum

References 

Monorails in India
Madurai